Berezhki is a rural locality (a village) in Muromtsevskoye Rural Settlement, Sudogodsky District, Vladimir Oblast, Russia. The population was 25 as of 2010.

Geography 
Berezhki is located on the left bank of the Sudogda River, 5 km south of Sudogda (the district's administrative centre) by road. Bashevo is the nearest rural locality.

References 

Rural localities in Sudogodsky District
Sudogodsky Uyezd